The Resort Trust Ladies golf tournament is an annual event on the LPGA of Japan Tour. It was first played in 1993. It was held in variety of courses in Honshu island, this year at Kansai Golf Club in Miki-shi. In 2021, the prize money is ¥80,000,000.

Winners 
2022 Sakura Koiwai
2021 Minami Katsu
2020 Cancelled
2019 Erika Hara
2018 Eri Okayama
2017 Kang Soo-yun
2016 Junko Omote
2015 Teresa Lu
2014 Teresa Lu
2013 Mamiko Higa
2012 Jeon Mi-jeong
2011 Sakura Yokomine
2010 Yoshimi Koda
2009 Jeon Mi-jeong
2008 Jeon Mi-jeong
2007 Momoko Ueda
2006 Mie Nakata
2005 Mitsuko Kawasaki
2004 Hiromi Mogi
2003 Yuri Fudoh
2002 Kozue Azuma
2001 Aki Takamura
2000 Yuri Fudoh
1999 Hiromi Takamura
1998 Kaori Harada
1997 Fumiko Muraguchi
1996 Aiko Hashimoto
1995 Ming-Yeh Wu
1994 Hsiu-Feng Tseng
1993 Miyuki Shimaburuko

LPGA of Japan Tour events
Golf tournaments in Japan
Recurring sporting events established in 1993
1993 establishments in Japan